The flying disc event at the 2017 World Games took place in Wrocław, Poland.

Qualified teams

Round robin

Standings

Matches

Medal matches

Bronze medal match

Gold medal match

Final ranking

References

External links
 Results book

2017 World Games
2017